Tazeh Kand-e Olya may refer to:
 Tazeh Kand-e Olya, Heris
 Tazeh Kand-e Olya, Maragheh